Lauro Salas (28 August 1928 in Monterrey, Nuevo León, Mexico – 18 January 1987) was a Mexican professional boxing world champion in the lightweight division.

Professional career
Salas was known as a tireless puncher, who often would wear his opponents out in the late rounds with a volume of punches. Boxing as a Featherweight for much of his early career, he was given a title shot against Lightweight champion Jimmy Carter on April 1, 1952, at the Olympic Auditorium in Los Angeles. Appearing to be well behind for the first ten rounds, Salas staged a late rally in the championship rounds, which he capped off with a two-count knockdown of the champion in the 15th round. Carter would win the unanimous decision, even as Salas won a lot of respect for his valiant effort.

Six weeks later as a 4-to-1 underdog he faced Carter again for the title at the Olympic in a rematch. This time around, he got off to a much better start, cut the champion, and once again overwhelmed Carter with his pressure in the late rounds. This time around, he was awarded a split decision over Carter, to win the World Lightweight Title.

On October 15, 1952, Salas fought a rubber match with Carter at Chicago Stadium. In the rematch Carter established control inside, dictating the pace, and cutting Salas over both of the eyes. With his vision hampered by cuts, along with the punishment he had taken from Carter, he was unable to sustain a late rally. Carter was awarded a wide unanimous decision, to regain the Lightweight title for the 2nd time.

Professional boxing record

See also
 Lineal championship
 List of lightweight boxing champions
 List of Mexican boxing world champions

References

External links
 

1928 births
1987 deaths
Sportspeople from Monterrey
Boxers from Nuevo León
World lightweight boxing champions
Mexican male boxers